
Qinglong may refer to:

Azure Dragon representing the East

Locations in China
Qinglong County, Guizhou (晴隆县)
Qinglong Manchu Autonomous County, Hebei

Towns
Qinglong Town, Anhui
Qinglong, Chongqing
Qinglong, Guizhou
Qinglong, Hebei, seat of Qinglong County
Qinglong, Jiangxi
Qinglong, Shanghai, ancient port and modern Town
Qinglong, Ziyang, in Jianyang, Sichuan
Qinglong, Pengshan County, Sichuan
Qinglong, Jianshui County, Yunnan
Qinglong, Huaning County, Yunnan

Townships
Qinglong Township, Anhui (Qīnglóng Xiāng)
Qinglong Township, Chongqing
Qinglong Township, Guangxi
Qinglong Township, Qu County, Sichuan
Qinglong Township, Xichong County, Sichuan
Qinglong Township, Yingjing County, Sichuan
Qinglong Township, Tibet

Rivers
Qinglong River (Hebei) (Qīnglóng Hé)
Qinglong River (Heilongjiang)
Qinglong River (Shandong)

Historical eras
Qinglong (233–237), era name used by Cao Rui, emperor of Cao Wei
Qinglong (350), era name used by Shi Jian, emperor of Later Zhao
Qinglong (398), era name used by Lan Han

See also
 Qinglong Temple (disambiguation)